Robert Van't Hof was the defending champion, but did not participate this year.

Alex Antonitsch won the tournament, beating Pat Cash in the final, 7–6, 6–3.

Seeds

Draw

Finals

Top half

Bottom half

References

External links
 Main draw

Seoul Open
1990 Seoul Open